Shamlu (also Romanized as Shāmlū) is a village in Jereh Rural District, Jereh and Baladeh District, Kazerun County, Fars Province, Iran. At the 2006 census, its population was 226, in 41 families.

References 

Populated places in Kazerun County